Joseph Girouard (April 8, 1854 – March 29, 1933) was a Quebec notary and political figure. He represented Two Mountains in the House of Commons of Canada as a Conservative member from 1892 to 1896.

He was born at St-Benoît, Canada East in 1854, the son of Jean-Joseph Girouard, and studied at the Collège des Sulpiciens at Montreal. Girouard qualified to practice as a notary in 1877 and set up practice at St-Benoît. He also acted as seigneurial agent for the seigneury of Lac des Deux-Montagnes for the Sulpicians. In 1879, he married Célanire, the daughter of merchant Daniel-Adolphe Plessis-Belair. Girouard was elected to the House of Commons in an 1892 by-election held after the death of Jean-Baptiste Daoust.

Electoral record

References 
 
Esquisses biographiques, 1795-1855 Jean-Joseph Girouard, l'ancien député du comté du Lac des Deux-Montagnes ..., GF Baillargé (1893)

1854 births
1933 deaths
Conservative Party of Canada (1867–1942) MPs
Members of the House of Commons of Canada from Quebec